Siegfried von Feuchtwangen (died 1311) was the 15th Grand Master of the Teutonic Knights, serving from 1303 to 1311.

Von Feuchtwangen was born in Feuchtwangen in Middle Franconia, and was a relative of the earlier Grand Master Konrad von Feuchtwangen. He took the office after his predecessor, Gottfried von Hohenlohe, had abdicated. Von Hohenlohe's rule was marked by internal strife within the Order, but also by important changes.

Under von Feuchtwangen, the Order seized Danzig (Gdańsk) in 1308 and took control of Pomerelia by the Treaty of Soldin, thus becoming Poland's strongest enemy. 

Due to the Pope dismantling the Knights Templar, he moved the headquarters of the order from Venice, located there by his predecessor, to Castle Marienburg in Pomesania, outside the Holy Roman Empire. 

Siegfried died there in 1311 and was buried in the cathedral of Kulmsee (Chełmża).

References

1311 deaths
People from Ansbach (district)
Grand Masters of the Teutonic Order
Year of birth unknown